Grey Goose Bus Lines was a subsidiary of Greyhound Canada operating in the Canadian province of  Manitoba.

History

1924-1934
Brown Brothers Bus Line
John (Jack) Smith started a bus service between Winnipeg and Carman.

1934-1961
Grey Goose Bus Lines Limited
The partnership of Gary M. Lewis, Elmer Clay, William R. Lewis, Albert J. Todd, and Alfred Hurshman was incorporated as Grey Goose Bus Lines Limited.

1961-1997
Grey Goose Bus Lines (Manitoba) Limited; CEO, Abram J. Thiessen/Bernard Thiessen

Public transit
Grey Goose operated the Thompson Transit system in Thompson, Manitoba until 2018.

References

External links
History of Intercity Buses Manitoba & Saskatchewan

Transport companies established in 1934
Defunct transport companies of Canada
FirstGroup companies
Defunct intercity bus companies of Canada
1934 establishments in Manitoba